Philippe Leleu (born 28 March 1958 in Lamballe, Côtes-d'Armor) was a French professional road bicycle racer.

Major results

1983
Tour de France:
Winner stage 20
Bain-de-Bretagne
1984
Plouec-sur-Lie

External links 

Official Tour de France results for Philippe Leleu

1958 births
Living people
People from Lamballe
French male cyclists
French Tour de France stage winners
Sportspeople from Côtes-d'Armor
Cyclists from Brittany
21st-century French people
20th-century French people